Bungay Castle is a Grade I listed building in the town of Bungay, Suffolk.

History

The site was originally a Norman castle built by Roger Bigod in about 1100 to take advantage of the natural protection provided by a curve in the River Waveney. Roger's son Hugh was a prominent player in the civil war period known as the Anarchy (1138–1154), and his loyalty was called into question during the early years of the reign of Henry II. Henry confiscated Bungay but in 1164 he returned it to Bigod, who built a large square Norman keep on the site in 1165. It is not recorded how much it cost to build the keep, but the archaeologist Hugh Braun, who led the excavations at the castle in the 1930s, estimated that it would have cost around £1,400. Bigod was on the losing side in the revolt of 1173–1174, and Bungay was besieged, mined and ultimately slighted by royal forces. According to the historian Sidney Painter, it was one of at least 21 castles demolished on Henry II's instructions.

The site was subsequently restored yet again to the Bigod family and was further developed in 1294 by Roger Bigod, 5th Earl of Norfolk, who probably built the massive gate towers on the site. He fell out with Edward I and after his death the castle reverted to the Crown, falling into disrepair and ruin. In 1483 it was re-acquired by the Dukes of Norfolk, who retained ownership until the 20th century, except for a short period in the late 18th century. In 1766 the site was sold to Robert Mickleborough, who quarried the keep and curtain walls for road-building materials. Later, in the early 1790s, it was purchased by Daniel Bonhôte, a local solicitor, but was sold back to the Dukes of Norfolk in about 1800.

Other than the removal in 1841 of dwellings that had been built on the site, little or no repairs were undertaken for several centuries.

Restoration and preservation
The castle's curtain walls and the twin towers of the gatehouse remain today, as well as a fragment of the keep. Restoration work under the supervision of Hugh Braun began in 1934, following excavations by the amateur archaeologist Leonard Cane. In 1987 the castle was given to the town of Bungay by the 17th Duke of Norfolk and is now owned by the Bungay Castle Trust. It was scheduled in 1915, one of the first sites to be protected under the Ancient Monuments Consolidation and Amendment Act of 1913, and was subsequently listed as a Grade I monument in 1949.

The castle in fiction
Bungay Castle was the setting for the eponymous novel by Elizabeth Bonhôte, Bungay Castle, a Gothic romance published in 1796, a few years after her husband Daniel had acquired the site.

References

External links
 Visit Bungay: Bungay Castle
 Visit East of England: Bungay Castle

Bungay
Waveney District
Ruins in Suffolk
Castles in Suffolk
Grade I listed buildings in Suffolk
Tourist attractions in Suffolk
Bigod family